Ido Zmishlany is a multi-platinum American record producer and songwriter. Ido has written and produced songs for such artists as Justin Bieber, Khalid, Shawn Mendes, Imagine Dragons, The Chainsmokers, Needtobreathe, Camila Cabello, Demi Lovato, Bea Miller, Sabrina Carpenter, Grace VanderWaal and The All-American Rejects.

Discography

References

Living people
Record producers from Los Angeles
Year of birth missing (living people)